Mark Landers (born 4 June 1966 from Dagenham, Essex) is a retired English professional darts player, and played in Professional Darts Corporation events.

Career
Landers played in the 2005 PDC World Darts Championship, defeating Alan Reynolds of Wales in Last 48 and but who lost in the last 40 to Peter Evison of England.

Landers played in two stages of UK Open, defeating Tom Kirby in Last 96, Jimmy Mann of England in Last 64 and but lost in the Last 32 stage to John Part of Canada.

Landers quit the PDC in 2006.

Landers retired in June 2019.

World Championship performances results

PDC
 2005: Last 40: (lost to Peter Evison 0–3) (sets)

References

External links
 

1966 births
Living people
English darts players
Professional Darts Corporation associate players